The UEFA European Under-21 Championship 2007 were held from 10 June 2007 to 23 June 2007. It was the 16th staging of UEFA's European Under-21 Championship.

Summary
For the first time, a host nation was chosen ahead of the competition – the Netherlands, who were also the defending champions, were exempt from qualifying. The host nation was chosen on 15 December 2005. England, Italy, Portugal, Turkey, and Sweden also submitted bids. Of UEFA's 52 member countries, only the Faroe Islands did not compete in the qualification round for the tournament. That left 50 nations attempting to qualify for the seven remaining spots at the finals.

This was the first time that the competition's final matches took place in an odd-numbered year. UEFA took this decision with the will to give more visibility to the tournament, since during even-numbered years the competition was clouded by the approaching FIFA World Cup or the UEFA European Championship.

The tournament also served as the European qualifying tournament for the 2008 Summer Olympics, with a place for the four semi-finalists of the tournament. However, as England is not an Olympic nation, their team was ineligible for the Olympics.  Therefore, with the event of England reaching the semi-finals, a fifth-place playoff was necessary.

In this competition, a new UEFA penalty shootout record was established. The semi final between The Netherlands U21 and England U21 finished 1-1. No less than 32 penalties had to be taken before the tie was decided. The Netherlands U21 won 13-12, and went on to win the tournament by defeating Serbia U21 4-1 in the final.

After the final, some commotion arose in the Netherlands because several Dutch internationals with Surinamese roots carried the flag of Suriname with them during the ceremony of the European Champion in the Euroborg. Dutch coach Foppe de Haan expressed the actions of these players as "inappropriate".

Qualification

In order to make the switch from even to odd-numbered years, the 2007 edition was a shortened version, condensed from a two-year campaign into a one-year campaign. Therefore, a completely new qualification format was devised to eliminate the weaker nations early, and saw a decrease in the size and duration of qualification groups.

Finals tournament

Draw

The draw for the finals took place in Arnhem on 24 November 2006, putting the eight qualifying nations into two groups. The provisional dates for the group games are 10 June to 17 June 2007, with Heerenveen and Arnhem each staging a semi-final on 20 June. The final took place on Saturday 23 June at the Euroborg stadium in Groningen.

The opening game was between the Netherlands and Israel at 10 June.

Venues

Squads

Finals group stage

In the following tables:

Group A

Group B

Knockout stage

Semi-finals

Final

Awards

Golden player
 Royston Drenthe

Goal scorers
4 goals
 Maceo Rigters
3 goals
 Leroy Lita
2 goals
 Alberto Aquilani
 Ryan Babel
 Giorgio Chiellini
 Kevin Mirallas
 Dragan Mrđa
 Miguel Veloso
1 goal
 Otman Bakkal
 Luigi Bruins
 Matt Derbyshire
 Royston Drenthe
 Manuel Fernandes
 Boško Janković
 Aleksandar Kolarov
 Hedwiges Maduro
 Dejan Milovanović
 Nani
 David Nugent
 Michal Papadopulos
 Sébastien Pocognoli
 Giuseppe Rossi
 Ricardo Vaz Tê

Medal table and Olympic qualifiers 
 Netherlands, Serbia, Belgium and Italy qualify for the Olympic games finals.
See Football at the 2008 Summer Olympics

Olympic Qualifying play-off
The 2007 European Under-21 Championship also served as the European qualifying round for the 2008 Olympic football tournament. Europe's four places at the Olympic tournament were to be filled by the four semi-finalists. However, because England, one of the semi-finalists, do not compete independently at the Olympics, following the group stage a play-off between Portugal and Italy, the two third-placed teams in each group, was arranged to identify the fourth European qualifier. Italy defeated Portugal through a penalty shoot-out booking their Olympic place in Beijing.

References

External links 

 Draw and Fixtures at uefa.com

 
UEFA
UEFA European Under-21 Championship
UEFA European Under-21 Championship
International association football competitions hosted by the Netherlands
UEFA
June 2007 sports events in Europe
2007 in youth association football